Paskov (masculine) or Paskova (feminine) is a Bulgarian surname. Notable people with the surname include:

Blagoy Paskov (born 1991), Bulgarian footballer
Dimitar Paskov (1914–1996), Bulgarian scientist
Ivan Paskov (born 1973), Bulgarian footballer
Pancho Paskov (born 1994), Bulgarian fencer
Viktor Paskov (1949–2009), Bulgarian writer, musician, musicologist and screenwriter

Bulgarian-language surnames